Philip Traynor may refer to:

Philip A. Traynor, United States politician
Phil Traynor, New Zealand international football (soccer) player